Astapa signata is a moth of the family Notodontidae. It is found in the western Andes of Colombia and Ecuador.

The forewings are green with salmon-coloured and reddish brown regions, especially along the anal margin.

References

Moths described in 1911
Notodontidae
Moths of South America